Fury is a 2001 six issue miniseries about Nick Fury written by Garth Ennis. The series was published under Marvels MAX imprint and featured much harder violence and explicit material than was common at the time which caused some controversy among fans and comic creators. The series takes place outside of main Marvel comics continuity and is interconnected with other series written by Garth Ennis under the Max imprint. It was followed by a prequel and a sequel.

Publication history
Three issues of the series were published in Germany in 2002 by Panini.

Plot
After the end of the Cold War Fury finds himself lost and incapable of enjoying himself like he used to when going to war. S.H.I.E.L.D. has tried to put him into a non-combat position and he feels bored and unneeded in the modern age.

Fury's luck begins to turn when he has a chance encounter at a bar with a former H.Y.D.R.A. operative named Rudi Gargarin. The two lament about the good old days when men could actually get their hands dirty. Gargarin proposes they quietly invade a seemingly non political island and run it into an all out war for their own benefit to get that feeling back again. Fury contemplates the idea but ultimately rejects it.

After Fury has sex with several Asian prostitutes his apartment is swarmed by assassins sent by Gargarin. Fury kills them all and decides to go to war. He forces his way through S.H.I.E.L.D and builds a small team of elite soldiers who will do precisely what he says and then goes with them to the island. The soldiers and Fury arrive with a relatively bloodless plan but soon that all flies out of the window. By the end Fury has to kill the last enemy by strangling him with his own intestines.

Reception
Writer-editor Stan Lee, a co-creator of Nick Fury, was critical of the extreme violence and gore of this new series: "I don't know why they're doing that. I don't think that I would do those kinds of stories." Actor George Clooney similarly condemned the books, the macabre contents of which prompted him to drop out of talks regarding portraying Fury in a then upcoming Marvel film. Gus Lubin of the Business Insider stated that "Fury is a smart and enjoyable comic, which portrays the spy chief as an aging "cold warrior" who on some deep level wants nothing more than to get his hands dirty again. Still, it's understandable that this portrayal of the character scared Clooney away." Clooney's dropout reportedly caused Avi Arad, the head of Marvel's West Coast division who is heavily involved in Marvel's film deals, to wield a harder grip on what content Marvel writers were allowed to publish.

Greg Burgas of Comic Book Resources described the book as a rather odd tribute to the character of Nick Fury. As the years went by the book reached a near legendary status among comic book readers. Ennis himself has expressed that he is very happy with the book and feels that it is in his top 10 favorite series he has written. He also praised his artist Robertson and expressed gratefulness to his editorial team which he felt let him do whatever he wanted with the work. He stated that he would never change a single thing about it.

Followups
Ennis wrote a prequel mini series in 2006 named Fury: Peacemaker and a sequel series named Fury: My War Gone By from 2012 to 2013.

Prints

Issues

Collected editions

See also
 2001 in comics

References

External links
 Fury at the Comic Book DB
 Fury at the Grand Comics Database

2001 comics debuts
Comics by Garth Ennis
Marvel Comics limited series
Nick Fury titles
War comics published by Marvel Comics